Scales ("Mistress of the Sea") is a 2019 internationally co-produced mystery drama film directed by Shahad Ameen. It was selected as the Saudi Arabian entry for the Best International Feature Film at the 93rd Academy Awards, but it was not nominated.

Cast
 Basima Hajjar as Hayat
 Yaaqoub Al Farhan as Muthana
 Abdulaziz Shtian as Yaser
 Ibrahim Al-Hasawi as Saada

See also
 List of submissions to the 93rd Academy Awards for Best International Feature Film
 List of Saudi Arabian submissions for the Academy Award for Best International Feature Film

References

External links
 

2019 films
2019 drama films
Saudi Arabian drama films
Emirati drama films
Emirati mystery films
Iraqi drama films
2010s Arabic-language films